Sandeep Angurala (born 27 November 1975) is an Indian former cricketer. He played thirteen first-class matches for Delhi between 1994 and 2001.

See also
 List of Delhi cricketers

References

External links
 

1975 births
Living people
Indian cricketers
Delhi cricketers
Cricketers from Delhi